The Rape of Hastings (also known as Hastings Rape) is one of the rapes, the traditional sub-divisions unique to the historic county of Sussex in England.

History
Rapes are territorial divisions, peculiar to Sussex, that were used for administrative purpose. The Rape of Hastings was one of six such divisions.

Medieval sources and place name evidence suggest that there were people living in what became the Rape of Hastings by the late 8th century. The people who were known as the Haestingas were a separate group to those of the South Saxons. The Haestingas became a sub-kingdom of the Kingdom of Sussex before being annexed by the Kingdom of Wessex

William the Conqueror granted the rape of Hastings to his cousin, Robert, Count of Eu, shortly after the Norman Conquest.

Location
Hastings rape is the easternmost of all the Sussex rapes and it borders the rape of Pevensey to the west. To the north and east of the rape lies the county of Kent, while to the south lies the English Channel. The rape of Hastings includes the towns of Battle, Hastings and Rye.

Sub-divisions
The rape is traditionally divided into the following hundreds:

 Baldstrow
 Battle
 Bexhill
 Foxearle
 Goldspur
 Gostrow
 Guestling
 Hawkesborough
 Henhurst
 Netherfield
 Ninfield
 Shoyswell
 Staple

See also
 History of Sussex
 List of hundreds of England and Wales

References

External links
 Hastings Rape through time  - A Vision of Britain
 The Sussex Subsidy of 1327 - The Rape of Hastings, British History Online

History of Sussex